"Shone" is  a song by American rapper Flo Rida. It was released as the second single from his second studio album R.O.O.T.S. (2009). The song features vocals from American singer Pleasure P and was produced by Jim Jonsin and Dre & Vidal. Before being released as a single, the song was used as a demo; in the demo version Rico Love sang the hook and second verse, both of which he wrote.

Music video
A music video for the song was uploaded to Myspace on 23 February 2009.

Release
In the United States, "Shone" peaked at number 57 on Billboard Hot 100 and at number 81 on the Billboard Hot R&B/Hip-Hop Songs chart. It also peaked at number 38 on the Canadian Hot 100.

Charts

Release history

References

2009 singles
Flo Rida songs
Song recordings produced by Jim Jonsin
Pleasure P songs
Songs written by Rico Love
Songs written by Jim Jonsin
Songs written by Vidal Davis
Songs written by Andre Harris
Song recordings produced by Dre & Vidal
2009 songs
Atlantic Records singles
Songs written by Flo Rida